Stephen Ellison Gordy (March 20, 1920 – October 27, 2006) was an American politician, military officer, and educator.

Early years and education

Stephen E. Gordy was born in Columbus, Georgia, where he attended public school. He was admitted to the United States Military Academy and graduated in 1943 and later from the Naval War College. He served in the United States Army during World War II and the Korean War. He retired with the rank of colonel.

Post military career
After his military service, Gordy was a teacher, principal, and coach (both football and baseball) in the Loudoun County, Virginia public school system. He later ran for public office and was elected to the Virginia House of Delegates, as a member of the Republican Party, and served from 1982 to 1987. During that period, he lived in Mantua, Virginia.

Death
Gordy retired to Dalton, Georgia where he was active in the Georgia Society of the Sons of the American Revolution. He died at his home in Dalton on October 27, 2006. The Dalton chapter of the Sons of the American Revolution renamed an annual awards dinner in recognition of Col. Gordy.

Notes

External links

1920 births
2004 deaths
People from Dalton, Georgia
People from Fairfax County, Virginia
United States Military Academy alumni
Naval War College alumni
Educators from Virginia
Republican Party members of the Virginia House of Delegates
20th-century American politicians
United States Army personnel of World War II
United States Army personnel of the Korean War